Sularbaşı is a village in the İliç District of Erzincan Province in Turkey.

References

Villages in İliç District